Something's Coming may refer to:

 "Something's Coming" (Desperate Housewives), an episode of the TV series Desperate Housewives
 "Something's Coming" (song), a song from the musical West Side Story
 Something's Coming! (album) a 1963 album by Gary Burton
 Something's Coming: The BBC Recordings 1969-1970, an album by Yes
 Something's Coming, a 2010 album by Ty Tabor
 "Something's Coming" (American Horror Story), an episode of the eleventh season of American Horror Story